The European Legislation Identifier (ELI) ontology is a vocabulary for representing metadata about national and European Union (EU) legislation. It is designed to provide a standardized way to identify and describe the context and content of national or EU legislation, including its purpose, scope, relationships with other legislations and legal basis. This will guarantee easier identification, access, exchange and reuse of legislation for public authorities, professional users, academics and citizens. ELI paves the way for knowledge graphs, based on semantic web standards, of legal gazettes and official journals.

History 
First established in the context of the European Forum of  Official Gazettes on the initiative of John Dann, director of the central service of legislation of Luxembourg, ELI has been further supporte by the subgroup mandated by the Council of the European Union in the framework of the Working Party on E-Law. ELI stems from the acknowledgement that the World Wide Web defines a new paradigm for legal information access, sharing and enrichment.

Community

European Legislation Identifier Task Force (ELI TF) 
The Task Force "European Legislation Identifier", short "ELI TF", is the body created by the eLaw/eLaw Working Party of the Council of the European Union to define ELI-related specifications and to ensure their future evolution.  For this purpose, the ELI TF has drafted a number of specifications that together form the ELI standard:

 Pillar I: Web identifiers for legal resources  
 Pillar II: ELI ontology: Metadata set specifying how to describe legal information, and its expression in a formal ontology
 Pillar III: Recommendations for integrating metadata into legislative website
 Pillar IV: Protocol to synchronize ELI metadata

The Task Force comprises representatives of Albania, Austria, Belgium, Croatia, Denmark, Finland, France, Hungary, Ireland, Italy, Luxembourg (chair), Malta, Norway, Poland, Portugal, Serbia, Slovenia, Spain, Switzerland, the United Kingdom and the EU Publications Office.

Overview : elements of ELI

Pillar I: ELI identifier
ELI uses URI Templates (RFC 6570)
 that carry semantics both from a legal and an end-user point of view.
Each Member State will build its own, self-describing URIs using the described components as well as taking into account their specific language requirements.
All the components are optional and can be selected based on national requirements and do not have a pre-defined order.
To enable the exchange of information the chosen URI template must be documented using the URI template mechanism.

Template:
/eli/{jurisdiction}/{agent}/{sub-agent}/{year}/{month}/{day}/{type}/{natural identifier}/{level 1…}/{point in time}/{version}/{language}
Example:
https://www.boe.es/eli/es/lo/2013/12/20/9 (Spain)
http://data.europa.eu/eli/dir/2020/1057/oj (European Union)

Pillar II: ELI ontology / metadata to describe legislation
In addition to HTTP URIs uniquely identifying legislation ELI encourages the use of relevant metadata elements to further describe it. Annex, section 2  fully specifies the corresponding recommended and optional elements and their underlying ontology.
The ELI ontology defines a common data model for exchanging legislation metadata on the web; the primary users of the ELI model are the official legal publishers of EU Member States, and the model can also be used by other organisations. The description of legislation in ELI is based on FRBRoo / CIDOC Conceptual Reference Model.

Pillar III: Recommendations for integrating metadata into legislative website 
ELI invites participating Member States to embed these metadata elements into the webpages of their legal information systems using RDFa or JSON-LD.

Example of RDFa serialisation for a Spanish legislation (extract):

Pillar IV: Protocol to synchronize ELI metadata
Pillar IV describes a protocol that enables ELI consumers to retrieve a) the exhaustive list of all ELI legal resources from a given ELI provider b) the list of last updated ELI legal resources from an ELI provider, using an Atom feed.

Extension of ELI standard : ELI-DL
During the years 2021/2022 the ELI standard was extended with the ELI-DL standard (ELI for Draft Legislation). 
The ELI (European Legislation Identifier) ontology for draft legislation (abbreviated ELI-DL) is an extension of the core ELI ontology that gives a formal data model to disseminate structured data about legislative projects. 

The aim is to support the following use-cases :
 easier and earlier data exchange between legal information systems; typically enable Member States to know that an EU Procedures foresees an impact on existing legislation, and prepare its transposition earlier;
 legal monitoring of legislative projects to be alerted early on the legislation being drafted;
 cross-link the description of the legislative project across multiple websites (typically OJ, parliament and comitees websites);
 increased transparency to the public through the publication of open data.

Resources 
Two guides are available to help guide teams implementing the ELI standard:
 ELI, the European legislation identifier: Good practices and guidelines.
 
 ELI technical guide

Applications 
As of 1st January 2023, ELI standard has been implemented by the following official gazettes : Albania, Austria, Belgium, Croatia, Denmark, EU-Publications Office, Finland, France, Hungary, Ireland, Italy, Luxembourg, Malta, Norway, Poland, Portugal, Serbia, Slovenia, Spain, Switzerland, United Kingdom.

Tools

ELI annotation tool 
The ELI annotation tool is a tool to enable legislation publishers to annotate and publish legal texts with metadata compliant to the ELI standard.
The ELI annotation tool is used for building notices describing several legal entities (legal resources, legal expressions and formats) using standard properties​​

ELI validator 
The ELI validator​​ is an online service that checks published ELI metadata against rules derived from the ELI ontology and produces a validation report. It helps ELI partners to assess the conformance of their data.

ELI/XML 
ELI/XML is an encoding of ELI metadata in an XML scheme (XSD). It can be used standalone or imported into other XML documents, typically in a metadata header. The ELI/XML scheme​​ is provided with a set of XML transformations to generate ELI in RDF/XML, RDFa header or HTML+RDFa. It is meant to facilitate the integration of ELI in XML-based document workflows.

Relationships with other standards
The values ​​of some ELI metadata are controlled by controlled vocabularies formalized with the Simple Knowledge Organization System ontology.

The ELI Task Force has proposed an extension of schema.org for the description of legislation schema.org/Legislation. An ELI/Schema.org converter is available.

See also
EUR-Lex
European Case Law Identifier (ECLI)
Lex (URN)

References

External links
 The European e-Justice Portal
 ELI Luxembourg
 ELI Register  on EUR-Lex
 ELI Metadata Registry 
 European Legislation Identifier "ELI" - un grand pas en avant pour la mise en place d’un web sémantique de l’information juridique
 European Legislation Identifier (ELI)

European Union law
Identifiers

Ontology languages